When The Music Stops is a dating franchise operating in the United Kingdom.  The company specialises in organising speed dating and singles events in towns and cities across the UK.  Since being established in January 2003, the business has sold over 25 franchises and run more than 3,000 events, covering most major UK towns and cities.  Franchisees operate their local singles events and dating services, including an online dating service and a personal introductions service, which acts as a traditional dating agency.

When The Music Stops has featured in the media numerous times, due to the large amount public interest speed dating has generated since its inception in 1998.  This has included several TV appearances and radio broadcasts, such as running a speed dating event for actor Rupert Everett on Channel 4's The Friday Night Project.

References

External links
Official Website
Australia Dating
Partner Search
Filipina Dating

Online dating services of the United Kingdom
Internet properties established in 2003